This is a list of media based in Philadelphia, Pennsylvania.

Newspapers and magazines

Former newspapers:
 Philadelphia Bulletin
 The Catholic Standard & Times
 L'Abeille américaine
 Philadelphia City Paper

Television stations
Network owned-and-operated stations are highlighted in bold.

AM radio stations

FM radio stations

Online Media

See also

List of radio stations in the Philadelphia market
Music of Philadelphia
Pen & Pencil Club
Prometheus Radio Project
List of newspapers in Pennsylvania in the 18th century: Philadelphia

External links
Philadelphia, PA on American Radio Map (Radiomap.us)

 
Philadelphia